Bailando 2018 is the thirteenth season of Bailando por un Sueño.
It started on September 3, 2018, on the El Trece network.

Cast

Couples
On July 24, the celebrities and professional partners were announced were officially confirmed at the press conference to present the program.

Hosts and judges

Marcelo Tinelli return as host, while judges Marcelo Polino and Ángel de Brito all returned this season. Pampita Ardohaín and Moria Casán did not return this season as a permanent judge. Laura Fernández, professional dancer, actress & host, and Florencia Peña, actress & comedian, become the new judge.

It also includes the incorporation of the BAR (Bailando Assistant Referee), inspired by the VAR (Video Assistant Referee), which is a video assistance system integrated by Lourdes Sánchez, Mariela Anchipi and Jorge Moliniers. Only the judges, choreographers, the head of coach and Marcelo Tinelli can ask for the BAR. The production is the one that authorizes if the BAR can intervene, the order is made after the judges score. In the galas, you will have the possibility to add or subtract a point. In the duel, the BAR can break the tie. In the semifinals and in the final, the BAR will have the possibility to choose the couple, according to their technical criteria, who better danced.

Scoring chart 

 In italics, partial scores without the secret ballot.
Red numbers indicate the lowest score for each style.
Green numbers indicate the highest score for each style.
 Indicates the couple sentenced.
 Indicates the couple was saved by the judges.
 Indicates the couple was saved by the public.
 Indicates the couple eliminated that round.
 Indicates the couple withdrew.
 Indicates the winning couple.
 Indicates the runner-up couple.
 Indicates the semi-finalists couples.

Notes:

A: All couples are sent to duel to define the semifinalists.

Highest and lowest scoring performances
The best and worst performances in each dance according to the judges' (more the BAR) 41-point scale are as follows:

Styles, scores and songs

Round 1: Disco 

 All songs will be sung live by guest singers.

      Sentenced: Joaquín Álvarez (13), Anamá Ferreira (13), Esmeralda Mitre (16), Ezequiel Cwirkaluk & Bárbara Silenzi (16), Florencia Tesouro (22) and Benjamín Alfonso (22)
      Saved by the judges: Joaquín Álvarez, Anamá Ferreira and Esmeralda Mitre
      Saved by the public: Benjamín Alfonso (38.93%)
      Eliminated: Florencia Tesouro (26.35%) and Ezequiel Cwirkaluk & Bárbara Silenzi (34.72%)

Round 2: Aquadance 

      Sentenced: Gabriel Usandivaras & Rebeca Vázquez (—), Anamá Ferreira (17), Sofía Jiménez (21), Marcela Baños (22) and Joaquín Álvarez (6 votes)
      Saved by the judges: Gabriel Usandivaras & Rebeca Vázquez, Marcela Baños and Sofía Jiménez
      Saved by the public: Anamá Ferreira (51.27%)
      Eliminated: Joaquín Álvarez (48.73%)

Round 3: Trio Salsa 

      Sentenced: Anamá Ferreira (11), María Sol Pérez (14), Julián Serrano & Sofía Morandi  (14), Benjamín Alfonso (19), Inés Banquer (19) and Soledad Fandiño (19)
      Saved by the judges: Julián Serrano & Sofía Morandi, Inés Banquer, María Sol Pérez and Soledad Fandiño
      Saved by the public: Benjamín Alfonso (63.38%)
      Eliminated: Anamá Ferreira (36.62%)

Round 4: Luis Miguel's songs 

      Sentenced: Florencia Marcasoli & Lucas Velasco (10), Esmeralda Mitre (10), Inés Banquer (14), Sofía Jiménez (14), Marcela Baños (14) and Benjamín Alfonso (24)
      Saved by the judges: Florencia Marcasoli & Lucas Velasco, Benjamín Alfonso and Esmeralda Mitre
      Saved by the public: Inés Banquer (42.11%)
      Eliminated: Marcela Baños (18.29%) and Sofía Jiménez (39.60%) 
      Withdrew: Florencia Vigna

Round 5: Cuarteto 

      Sentenced: María Sol Pérez (12), Micaela Viciconte (12), Gabriel Usandivaras & Rebeca Vázquez (13) and Benjamín Alfonso (16)
      Saved by the judges: Gabriel Usandivaras & Rebeca Vázquez and María Sol Pérez
      Saved by the public: Micaela Viciconte (62.03%)
      Eliminated: Benjamín Alfonso (37.97%)

Round 6: Free Style 

      Sentenced: Natalie Weber (10), María Sol Pérez (15) and Inés Storck Banquer (19)
      Saved by the judges: María Sol Pérez
      Saved by the public: Mariela Anchipi (replacing Natalie Weber) (50.19%)
      Eliminated: Inés Stork (49.81%)
      Withdrew: Flavio Mendoza & Belén Pouchán

Round 7: Synchro dance 

      Sentenced: Cinthia Fernández (2), Gabriel Usandivaras & Rebeca Vázquez (9) and María del Cerro & Facundo Mazzei (16)
      Saved by the judges: Cinthia Fernández
      Saved by the public: María del Cerro & Facundo Mazzei (72.06%)
      Eliminated: Gabriel Usandivaras & Rebeca Vázquez (27.94%)

Round 8: Cumbia  

      Sentenced: Esmeralda Mitre (5), Micaela Viciconte (17), María Sol Pérez (17)  and Lucas Velasco & Florencia Marcasoli (21)
      Saved by the judges: María Sol Pérez and Micaela Viciconte 
      Saved by the public: Esmeralda Mitre (53.81%)
      Eliminated: Lucas Velasco & Florencia Marcasoli (46.19%)

Round 9: Bachata 

      Sentenced: Esmeralda Mitre (8), Jimena Barón (17), Soledad Fandiño (17) and Micaela Viciconte (22)
      Saved by the judges: Jimena Barón and Micaela Viciconte
      Saved by the public: Soledad Fandiño (65.56%) 
      Eliminated: Esmeralda Mitre (34.44%)

Round 10: Folklore 

      Sentenced: María Sol Pérez (11), Cinthia Fernández (15), Natalie Weber (15) and Diego Ramos & Lourdes Sánchez (16)
      Saved by the judges: Cinthia Fernández and Diego Ramos & Lourdes Sánchez
      Saved by the public: María Sol Pérez (51.38%)
      Eliminated: Natalie Weber (48.62%)

Round 11: Tributes 

      Sentenced: Julián Serrano & Sofía Morandi (11), María del Cerro & Facundo Mazzei (19), María Sol Pérez (19) and Jimena Barón (22)
      Saved by the judges: Jimena Barón and Julián Serrano & Sofía Morandi
      Saved by the public: María del Cerro & Facundo Mazzei (68.77%)
      Eliminated: María Sol Pérez (31.23%)

Round 12: Cha-cha-pop 

      Sentenced: Julián Serrano & Sofía Morandi (5), Soledad Fandiño (12), Micaela Viciconte (16) and María del Cerro & Facundo Mazzei (16)
      Saved by the judges: Julián Serrano & Sofía Morandi and Micaela Viciconte
      Saved by the public: María del Cerro & Facundo Mazzei (67.88%)
      Eliminated: Soledad Fandiño  (32.12%)

Round 13: Tango 

Key
      Saved by the judges      Saved by the public

Order of salvation
      First semifinalist couple: Jimena Barón
      Second semifinalist couple: Micaela Viciconte (30.36%)
      Third semifinalist couple: Julián Serrano & Sofía Morandi
      Fourth semifinalist couple: María del Cerro & Facundo Mazzei (27.32%)
      Eliminated: Cinthia Fernández and Diego Ramos & Lourdes Sánchez

Semifinals

1st Semi-final 

Notes
 : The point is for the couple.
 : The point is not for the couple.

Result
      Finalists: Julián Serrano & Sofía Morandi
      Semifinalist: Micaela Viciconte

2nd Semifinal 

Notes
 : The point is for the couple.
 : The point is not for the couple.
Result
      Finalist: Jimena Barón
      Semifinalists: María del Cerro & Facundo Mazzei

Final 

Notes
 : The point is for the couple.
 : The point is not for the couple.

Result:
      Winners: Julián Serrano & Sofía Morandi
      Runner-up: Jimena Barón

Nominations 
In week 2, participants were given the opportunity to nominate one of the couples. This nomination occurred after the secret ballot was known. The participants already sentenced, by the vote of the judges, could not be nominated.

 Sentenced
 Nominated

References

External links

Argentina
Argentine variety television shows
2018 Argentine television seasons